Vicente Gómez Fernández (born 9 September 1971) is a Spanish football manager, who is an assistant manager at Emirati club Al Ain.

Football career
Born in Santurtzi, Greater Bilbao, he was known as Vicen in his playing career as a defender. In three Segunda División B seasons for hometown club CD Santurtzi, he played 70 games and scored once in a 2–1 loss at Beasain KE on 7 February 1993.

Gómez began his coaching career with minor roles at Athletic Bilbao, later becoming manager of their farm team, CD Basconia of the Tercera División. In 2014, he moved to Ukraine's FC Dynamo Kyiv and their under-19 and under-21 teams. Two years later, he was made assistant to Serhii Rebrov, the first-team manager.

After further roles as right-hand man at Al Ahli Saudi FC and FC Spartak Moscow,  on 3 September 2019 Gómez returned to Ukraine to become head coach of Olimpik Donetsk.

On 10 July 2020, Gómez was hired at Sabah FC of the Azerbaijan Premier League on a two-year contract.

See also
 Raúl Riancho

References

External links
 
 

1971 births
Living people
People from Santurtzi
Spanish footballers
Footballers from the Basque Country (autonomous community)
Association football defenders
Segunda División B players
CD Santurtzi players
Spanish football managers
Ukrainian Premier League managers
FC Olimpik Donetsk managers
Spanish expatriate football managers
Expatriate football managers in Ukraine
Spanish expatriate sportspeople in Ukraine
Expatriate football managers in Saudi Arabia
Spanish expatriate sportspeople in Saudi Arabia
Expatriate football managers in Russia
Spanish expatriate sportspeople in Russia
Expatriate football managers in Azerbaijan
Spanish expatriate sportspeople in Azerbaijan
CD Basconia managers